Grange railway station was a railway station in the parish of Grange, historically in  Banffshire (although currently in Moray).

The Great North of Scotland Railway was absorbed by the London and North Eastern Railway in 1923 and  became part of British Railways when the railways were nationalised in 1948. The station was recommended for closure by Dr Beeching's report "The Reshaping of British Railways" and closed on 6 May 1968. The railway remains open as the Aberdeen to Inverness Line.

History
An extension of this line to  opened on 10 October 1856, with Grange one of the intermediate stations.

On 30 July 1859 the Banff, Portsoy and Strathisla Railway opened a  line from  Grange to Banff and a  branch from Tillynaught to Portsoy. The GNoSR took over services on 1 February 1863, and the railway renamed the Banffshire Railway. An extension to Portgordon was authorised, but this was abandoned in 1867 and the Banffshire absorbed by the GNoSR. The line to Portgordon was later revived and extended along the Moray Firth coast to Elgin, and this opened on 1 May 1886. A curve was opened at the junction to allow Aberdeen trains direct access to the Coast Line without reversing at the station.

In 1923 the Great North of Scotland Railway was absorbed by the London and North Eastern Railway. This was nationalised in 1948, and services provided by British Railways. The stopping services on the Aberdeen to Inverness Line were recommended to be withdrawn in Dr Beeching's report "The Reshaping of British Railways", and the station closed on 6 May 1968.

Services
Initially there were five services a day between Aberdeen and Keith, although this was later reduced to four. After the GNoSR took over branch services there were three trains a day to Banff.

A complex system of train portion working towards Inverness gave a service of 4 trains a day over the direct route via Mulben, three via Craigellachie (four on Sundays) and four via the Coast line. There were no Sunday services.

References

Footnotes

Sources

Further reading

External links
RAILSCOT on Banff Portsoy and Strathisla Railway 

Former Great North of Scotland Railway stations
Disused railway stations in Moray
Railway stations in Great Britain opened in 1856
Railway stations in Great Britain closed in 1968
Beeching closures in Scotland